The Chesterfield School District is a community public school district that serves students in pre-kindergarten through sixth grades from Chesterfield Township in Burlington County, New Jersey, United States.

As of the 2020–21 school year, the district, comprised of one school, had an enrollment of 723 students and 67.0 classroom teachers (on an FTE basis), for a student–teacher ratio of 10.8:1.

The district is classified by the New Jersey Department of Education as being in District Factor Group "GH", the third-highest of eight groupings. District Factor Groups organize districts statewide to allow comparison by common socioeconomic characteristics of the local districts. From lowest socioeconomic status to highest, the categories are A, B, CD, DE, FG, GH, I and J.

Public school students in seventh through twelfth grades attend the schools of the Northern Burlington County Regional School District, which also serves students from Mansfield Township, North Hanover Township and Springfield Township, along with children of United States Air Force personnel based at McGuire Air Force Base. The schools in the district (with 2020–21 enrollment data from the National Center for Education Statistics) are 
Northern Burlington County Regional Middle School with 743 students in grades 7 - 8 and 
Northern Burlington County Regional High School with 1,403 students in grades 9-12. Both schools are in the Columbus section of Mansfield Township. Using a formula that reflects the population and the value of the assessed property in each of the constituent municipalities, taxpayers in Chesterfield Township pay 21.6% of the district's tax levy, with the district's 2013-14 budget including $35.6 million in spending.

History
In December 2007, voters approved a referendum under which the district would spend $37.7 million (equivalent to $ million in ) to construct a new school building. The new school opened in January 2011, after having been pushed back from an original target opening date of September 2010. Costs related to the construction of the new school building and growing enrollment led to an increase in 8.6% in the local tax levy in the 2011-12 budget, which had grown to $9.4 million.

Schools
Chesterfield Elementary School had an enrollment of 715 students in grades PreK-6 as of the 2020–21 school year.
Michael D. Mazzoni, Principal of Operations
Coletta Graham, Principal of Instruction & Community Engagement

Administration
Core members of the district's administration are:
Scott Heino, Superintendent
Andrew Polo, Business Administrator / Board Secretary

Board of education
The district's board of education is comprised of five members who set policy and oversee the fiscal and educational operation of the district through its administration. As a Type II school district, the board's trustees are elected directly by voters to serve three-year terms of office on a staggered basis, with either one or two seats up for election each year held (since 2012) as part of the November general election. The board appoints a superintendent to oversee the district's day-to-day operations and a business administrator to supervise the business functions of the district.

References

External links
Chesterfield Elementary School

School Data for the Chesterfield Elementary School, National Center for Education Statistics
Northern Burlington County Regional School District

School Data for the Northern Burlington County Regional School District, National Center for Education Statistics

Chesterfield Township, New Jersey
New Jersey District Factor Group GH
School districts in Burlington County, New Jersey
Public elementary schools in New Jersey